Genitocotyle is a genus of trematodes in the family Opecoelidae. The species of Genitocotyle are endoparasitic in certain marine fishes.

Species
Genitocotyle acirrus Park, 1937
Genitocotyle atlantica Manter, 1947
Genitocotyle cablei Nahhas & Short, 1965
Genitocotyle heterostichi Montgomery, 1957
Genitocotyle mediterranea Bartoli, Gibson & Riutort, 1994

References

Opecoelidae
Plagiorchiida genera